Chaman-e-Bid (also Romanized as Chaman Bīd, Chaman Bīd, and Chaman Bid) is a village in Almeh Rural District, Samalqan District, Maneh and Samalqan County, North Khorasan Province, Iran. At the 2006 census, its population was 1,393, in 349 families.

References 

Populated places in Maneh and Samalqan County